Sarıbeyli can refer to:

 Sarıbeyli, Çanakkale
 Sarıbeyli, Çivril